Vista Tower may refer to:
Vista Tower (Chicago), United States
Vista Tower (Kuala Lumpur), Malaysia

Buildings and structures disambiguation pages